Zygoceras okutanii is a species of sea snail, a marine gastropoda mollusk in the family Haloceratidae.

Original description
   Poppe G. & Tagaro S. (2010) New species of Haloceratidae, Columbellidae, Buccinidae, Mitridae, Costellariidae, Amathinidae and Spondylidae from the Philippines. Visaya 3(1):73-93.

References

External links
 Worms Link

Haloceratidae